Avelino Gomez (1928 – June 21, 1980) was a Cuban-born Hall of Fame jockey in American and Canadian thoroughbred horse racing.

Born in Havana, Gomez began a career as a jockey at the urging of a family member. He won his first race in Mexico City and later moved to the United States, where he built a reputation as a very capable rider, gaining considerable attention after winning six races during one racecard at Ascot Park in Akron, Ohio. He eventually began riding at Woodbine Racetrack in Toronto, Ontario, where he made his home and became a dominant force in racing for more than twenty years.

Canada's top jockey on seven occasions, in 1966 Gomez became the first jockey in Canadian racing history to win 300 races in a single season. His 318 wins that year were tops in North America. His win percentage of .32 for the 1966 season  was the highest ever for a North American champion, a record that still stands. He was a four-time winner of Canada's most prestigious race, the Queen's Plate, and the winner of the 1977 Sovereign Award for Outstanding Jockey.

In 1978, Gomez was recognized with the Sovereign Award of Merit for his lifetime contribution to the sport. He was elected to the Canadian Horse Racing Hall of Fame in 1977, the U.S. National Museum of Racing and Hall of Fame in 1982, the Canada's Sports Hall of Fame in 1990, and the Ontario Sports Hall of Fame in 1997.

Gomez died of complications after a three-horse accident during the running of the Canadian Oaks in 1980. He had won 4,081 races with a 24% winning percentage.

The Avelino Gomez Memorial Award is given annually to the person, Canadian-born, Canadian-raised, or a regular rider in the country for more than five years, who has made significant contributions to the sport. A life-size statue of Gomez can be seen at Woodbine Racetrack.

References

External links
 Avelino Gomez at the Canadian Horse Racing Hall of Fame
 Avelino Gomez at the United States National Museum of Racing and Hall of Fame
 

1928 births
1980 deaths
Accidental deaths in Ontario
Animal sportspeople from Ontario
Canadian Horse Racing Hall of Fame inductees
Cuban emigrants to Canada

Cuban jockeys

Jockeys who died while racing
Sportspeople from Havana
Sovereign Award winners
Sport deaths in Canada
United States Thoroughbred Racing Hall of Fame inductees
Cuban expatriates in the United States